The 1917–18 Maltese First Division was the seventh season of the Maltese First Division. With each team playing each other once, Ħamrun Spartans and St. George's finished equal on points. The decider play-off played between the two saw Ħamrun Spartans triumphing 4–2, thereby gaining their second league title.

League table

Championship tie-breaker
With both Ħamrun Spartans and St. George's level on 12 points, a play-off match was conducted to decide the champion.

Results

See also 
 1917 in association football
 1918 in association football

1917-18
1917–18 in European association football leagues
1917 in Malta
1918 in Malta